"The Shower Head" is the 126th episode of NBC sitcom Seinfeld. This is the sixteenth episode for the seventh season. It aired on February 15, 1996. It had 32.3 million US viewers. This episode focuses on Jerry and George's struggles to get their respective parents to move out of New York. Meanwhile, the tenants of Jerry's apartment building are made miserable by the new low-flow showerheads, and Elaine takes a drug test for work which comes back positive for opium.

Plot
Jerry's apartment building has new low-flow showerheads installed. Unable to even wash shampoo out of their hair with the new heads, Jerry, Kramer, and Newman look for other options. Newman passes along a tip for black market Yugoslavian showerheads. Kramer picks a high pressure showerhead used for elephants, which forces him out of the tub when he uses it.

Feeling unprepared to move into Del Boca Vista, Jerry's parents stay at Uncle Leo's New York apartment, while Leo moves in with his new girlfriend, Lydia. Jerry gets annoyed by his parents calling him regularly, since they are now in his local calling area. He encourages Uncle Leo to break up with Lydia so that he will have to move back into his own apartment and evict Jerry's parents. When Jerry tells George that his parents are moving to Del Boca Vista, George is inspired to try to convince his parents to move to Del Boca Vista. Morty and Helen run into George's parents. To discourage them from going to Del Boca Vista, Morty claims there are no available condos there.

On The Tonight Show with Jay Leno, Jerry tells Jay Leno about Uncle Leo and how he blames all his misfortunes on antisemitism. Leo and Lydia watch the show, and Lydia laughs at Jerry's story, causing Leo to call her antisemitic and break up with her. As Jerry hoped, this pushes his parents to go back to Florida. However, the Costanzas decide to move to Del Boca Vista to spite Morty's attempt to keep them away. Unwilling to share the complex with the Costanzas, Morty and Helen move into Jerry's apartment.

Elaine takes a urine test in order to go on a work trip to Kenya with her boss, J. Peterman. She tests positive for opium. Elaine insists she has never taken drugs, but when a frantic Kramer shows up at her office begging her to let him use her normal-pressure shower, Peterman mistakes him for a drug addict and fires Elaine. Elaine realizes that the test is picking up the poppy seeds in her favorite muffins. She persuades Peterman to let her take the test again, but a half-hour before the test she realizes that a piece of chicken she ate at Jerry's apartment had poppy seeds on it. She asks Helen for her urine sample and passes it off as her own. It tests negative for drugs, but shows she has the metabolism of an elderly woman; Elaine thus gets her job back but still cannot go to Kenya.

Jerry convinces Leo to reconcile with Lydia, so that his parents can go back to Leo's apartment. However, when low-flow showerheads are installed in Leo's apartment building, the Seinfelds can't stand to remain there. The Costanzas end up not going, because they cannot bear being away from George, leaving the Seinfelds free to leave for Florida.

Production
Low-flow showerheads being installed in Jerry's apartment was one of the first story ideas episode co-writer Peter Mehlman submitted for Seinfeld, back in 1991. A scene showing Jerry trying out his own new high-pressure showerhead, a companion to the end scene with Kramer, was filmed but deleted before broadcast.

References

External links

Shower Head, The
1996 American television episodes
Television episodes about antisemitism
Drug testing